Shiladitya Bora is an Indian film producer, director, marketer and distributor. He is the founder of Platoon One Films, a Mumbai-based film production studio. Bora was born and brought up in Assam and completed his undergraduate and post-graduate studies in Ahmedabad. He started his film career by spearheading the indie release banner PVR Pictures’ Directors’ Rare, a limited release arm of India’s biggest film exhibitor, PVR Cinemas group. Under this banner, he successfully released more than 85 independent films. In 2015, Bora was recognised for his work in marketing and distribution and was selected as one of the Berlinale Talents of the year. As the first CEO of Drishyam Films, Bora served as an Associate Producer on critically acclaimed films like Masaan (2015) and Newton (2017). He helped develop Newton from a one-line pitch to a story and greenlit the film to production. Newton went on to be selected as India’s official entry for the 90th Academy Awards. In 2017, Bora founded Platoon One Films, a Mumbai based production studio with his wife and costume designer Shilpi Agarwal. Platoon One Films’ maiden Hindi production Yours Truly, directed by Sanjoy Nag, starring Soni Razdan, Pankaj Tripathi and Aahana Kumra, premiered at the Busan International Film Festival 2018 and travelled to many festivals worldwide. Platoon One Films then went on to produce the National Award-Winning Marathi film Picasso, directed by Abhijeet Warang and starring Prasad Oak.

Early life and education
Bora did his schooling in Assam and then his Bachelor's in Engineering from Lalbhai Dalpatbhai College of Engineering, Ahmedabad in 2005. He enrolled into Mudra Institute of Communications, Ahmedabad (MICA) for the Post Graduate program in Communication Management and Entrepreneurship. During his studies, he started FulMarxx Shorts Fest in 2008 which was rebranded in 2009 to a full-fledged film festival called Ahmedabad International Film Festival. Bora was awarded the MICA Award for Creative and Entrepreneurial Excellence in 2008 for this venture.

Career
2010-2015

Bora started his film career by founding a film club called Sunset Boulevard. In tie-up with PVR Cinemas, who offered the venue, the film club conducted regular screenings for its members for a nominal fee. Impressed by the business model, PVR Cinemas decided to collaborate with Bora to replicate this format on a larger scale and conduct multi-city film festivals. In 2010 Bora, under the tutelage of Gautam Dutta, started PVR Cinemas’ first indie release banner called PVR Directors’ Rare. Under this banner, Shiladitya released around 85 films, which included fiction, documentary and experimental cinema from over the world.

2015-2017

In 2015, Bora became the first CEO of Drishyam Films, one of India’s biggest independent film production companies. He served as an Associate Producer on critically acclaimed films such as Masaan, Waiting, Rukh and Newton. Each film garnered tremendous international acclaim and Newton went on to be selected as India's official entry into the Oscars in 2018. Bora also worked as the Executive Producer on the National Film Award winner Dhanak directed by Nagesh Kukunoor.

2017-2021

In 2017, Bora founded Platoon One Films, a Mumbai based film production studio, with costume designer and wife Shilpi Agarwal.

Platoon One Films has marketed and distributed over 60 films, both domestic and international, over its 4-year span. In 2020, Bora marketed and distributed the Cannes Film Award Winning Is love enough? Sir directed by Rohena Gera, starring Tillotama Shome and Vivek Gomber. The film also went on to win two Indian Filmfare Awards, for Best Actress and Best Screenplay in 2021.

Platoon One Films’ maiden Hindi production Yours Truly was directed by the National Award-Winning director Sanjoy Nag. The film starring Soni Razdan, Pankaj Tripathi, Aahana Kumra and Mahesh Bhatt had its world premiere at the Busan International Film Festival 2018. In 2019, Bora directed his first short film Aapke Aa Jane Se starring Manu Rishi Chaddha. The short premiered at New York Indian Film Festival in 2019 and was screened at over 20 film festivals worldwide.

The second production undertaken by the banner was a Marathi language film called Picasso directed by Abhijeet Mohan Warang. The film stars the National Award-winning actor Prasad Oak and child artist Samay Tambe. In 2021, it won the National Film Award for Best Feature Film in Special mention. 

Bora's Hindi feature directorial debut film Bhagwan Bharose starring Masumeh Makhija, Vinay Pathak, Shrikant Verma and Manu Rishi Chaddha, wrapped up shoot in March 2021 and is currently in post-production.

Filmography

References

External links
 
Shiladitya Bora on Facebook
Shiladitya Bora on Instagram
Shiladitya Bora on Twitter

Living people
Year of birth missing (living people)
People from Assam
Lalbhai Dalpatbhai College of Engineering alumni
Hindi film producers
Indian film directors
Indian film distributors